Synthesis is the third album by The Cryan' Shames and was released in 1968. It contains some lineup changes from their second album, A Scratch in the Sky. Drummer Dennis Conroy was replaced by Alan Dawson, and Jim Fairs moved on with Dave Carter on guitar. Synthesis is an apt name for an album that, like its predecessor, A Scratch in the Sky, proved the Cryan' Shames to be among the most versatile mainstream pop/rock groups of the late 1960s.

"Greenburg, Glickstein, Charles, David, Smith and Jones" was covered by Proto-Kaw, a reformed version of Kerry Livgren's early-1970s pre-Kansas band, on their 2004 album Before Became After.

Track listing

Side 1:
"Greenburg, Glickstein, Charles, David Smith and Jones" (Isaac Guillory) - 2:17
"Baltimore Oriole" (Hoagy Carmichael, Paul Francis Webster) - 4:31
"It's All Right" (D.P. "Dad" Carter) - 2:11
"Your Love" (Lenny Kerley) - 3:29
"A Master's Fool" (Isaac Guillory) - 3:40

Side 2:
"First Train to California" (Jim Fairs) - 2:57
"The Painter" (Isaac Guillory) - 2:52
"Sweet Girl of Mine" (Lenny Kerley) - 2:26
"20th Song" (Lenny Kerley) - 2:08
"Let's Get Together" (Dino Valente) - 3:28
"Symphony of the Wind" (Isaac Guillory) - 3:25

Personnel 
Tom Doody – vocals
Jim Pilster – vocals and percussion
Alan Dawson – drums and vocals
Dave Carter – vocals and guitar
Isaac Guillory – vocals, guitar, bass and keyboards
Lenny Kerley – vocals, bass and guitar

Availability
The 2002 Sundazed remastered CD reissue adds 8 bonus tracks. Six of them are single versions of tracks from the LP; the other two present both sides of their 1969 single, "Bits and Pieces"/"Rainmaker", which matched a country-rock original with a Harry Nilsson cover. Also featured is a hidden bonus track at the end of "Rainmaker", which appears to be a radio spot for the album.

References

1968 albums
The Cryan' Shames albums
Columbia Records albums